Van Quickenborne is a Dutch surname. Notable people with the surname include:

Charles Felix Van Quickenborne (1788–1837), Belgian Jesuit
Vincent Van Quickenborne (born 1973), Belgian politician

Surnames of Dutch origin